Perry Bhandal (born 12 January 1968) is a British film director, screenwriter, and producer of the films Interview with a Hitman and The Last Boy and author of _prelude, a collection of short stories and artwork, and The Winter Man a crime thriller.

Early life

Bhandal was born in Taplow, England and is of Sikh heritage. He received a BSc from the University of Manchester and two M.A.s from the University of Brunel: one in film and one in creative writing.

Career
In May 2009 Bhandal set up the film production company Kirlian Pictures and set about developing the feature film Interview with a Hitman.

Bhandal shot Interview with a Hitman in 18 days in August 2011 on location in Newcastle and Bucharest. The film had its market premiere at the Cannes Film Festival in May 2012 and has gone on to sell in Major territories worldwide.

Interview with a Hitman was released theatrically in the UK on 20 July 2012. It was released in the US on 5 March 2013.

Bhandal shot his second feature, the Rumi inspired sci fi, fantasy, thriller The Last Boy ' in 2017. The film is due to be released in 2018.

Filmography

Feature films

References

Footnotes

External links
 
 Director Perry Bhandal

1968 births
Living people
British film producers
British male screenwriters
British film directors
English Sikhs